Valérie Plante (born June 14, 1974) is a Canadian politician serving as the 45th and current mayor of Montreal since 2017. First elected to Montreal City Council in the 2013 election, she has served as leader of the Projet Montréal party since December 2016.

Plante was Projet Montréal's candidate for mayor in the 2017 municipal election, and was elected Mayor of Montreal on November 5, 2017. She is the first woman to be elected mayor of Montreal, having been preceded only by councillor Jane Cowell-Poitras's two brief stints as acting mayor following mayoral resignations in the early 2010s and by the ceremonial appointment of Lise Payette as mayor of the city for one day to mark the International Women's Year in 1976.

Early life and education 
Plante was born in Rouyn-Noranda, Quebec, on June 14, 1974.  She spent a year in North Bay, Ontario as a teenager to learn English. In 1994, she moved to Montreal to attend university, receiving a degree in anthropology in 1997, and another in museology in 2001. She then worked for a number of non-profit organizations, most notably as communications director of the Girls Action Foundation – Fondation Filles d'Action.

In the 1990s, she worked as a tour guide at Vimy Ridge in France.

Political career

City councillor 
In the 2013 Montreal municipal election, Plante was elected councillor for the Sainte-Marie district of the Ville-Marie borough, defeating former provincial minister and 2009 Montreal mayoral candidate Louise Harel. She was named opposition critic for downtown, tourism, and for women's affairs. She was also named vice-president of city council, as well as substitute mayor for Ville-Marie.

In the fall of 2016, Plante announced her run for the leadership of Projet Montréal. She went on to win the leadership election with 51.9%, defeating Guillaume Lavoie.

2017 mayoral campaign 
Valérie Plante was elected Mayor of Montreal on November 5, 2017, becoming the first woman to be elected in this position. Few had predicted that Plante would be able to take down the incumbent mayor, Denis Coderre, a former Liberal MP and cabinet minister, at the beginning of the campaign. Plante won over voters on a promise to improve public transit, alleviate traffic woes and make the city more family friendly. On election day, Plante won 51 percent of the vote, compared to 46 percent for Coderre. Projet Montréal also won a majority of seats on the city council. One of Plante's key campaign planks in the 2017 municipal election was the creation of a "Pink Line", a new Montreal Metro line to improve public transit service between downtown and on two axes to the boroughs of Montréal-Nord and Lachine. Her election posters were hung up around Montreal to spread her mayoral ideas. Valérie Plante claimed that her posters were strategically placed in certain areas where she knew her ideas would easily be spread.

2021 mayoral campaign 

Plante decisively won the November 7, 2021 against Coderre by a wider margin, taking 52 percent of the vote to his 37 percent. The majority of Project Montréal on council was also increased. Plante campaigned on adding 60,000 social housing units and continuing to focus on improving urban life.

Personal life 
Plante has two children. She is married to Pierre-Antoine Harvey, an economist with the Centrale des syndicats du Québec.

References

External links 
 Valérie Plante, Mayor of Montréal

Mayors of Montreal
Living people
Ville-Marie, Montreal
1974 births
21st-century Canadian politicians
21st-century Canadian women politicians
Women mayors of places in Quebec
Female Canadian political party leaders
People from Rouyn-Noranda
Université de Montréal alumni